The 1993–94 Toronto Maple Leafs season saw the Leafs finish in second place in the Central Division with a record of 43 wins, 29 losses and 12 ties for 98 points. The team opened the 1993–94 regular season with ten consecutive wins and made it to the Conference Finals for the second straight year. They defeated the Chicago Blackhawks in six games in the Conference Quarterfinals, then eliminated the San Jose Sharks in a seven-game Conference Semifinal series. However, they lost the Western Conference Finals in five games to the Vancouver Canucks.

Off-season
The NHL re-organized in the off-season, and the Leafs were placed in the new Central Division.

Preseason
The Leafs played a pair of preseason games at Wembley Arena in London versus the New York Rangers on September 12 and 13, 1993.  The Leafs lost both games and the prize money of $50,000.

Regular season
The Leafs started the season with a ten-game winning streak, an NHL record they currently share with the 2006–07 Buffalo Sabres.

Doug Gilmour ranked fourth in the NHL in scoring with 111 points.

During the regular season, the Maple Leafs had the most power-play opportunities (459) out of all 26 teams.

Season standings

Neutral site games

Schedule and results

1 Played at Copps Coliseum in Hamilton, Ontario.

Playoffs
The Maple Leafs entered the playoffs as the third seed in the Western Conference beginning their playoff run against number six Chicago Blackhawks.

After defeating Chicago Blackhawks the
Leafs would go on to play the eighth
seed San Jose Sharks in the conference semi finals.

With the win in game seven against San Jose Toronto would go on to play the Vancouver Canucks, who would end their playoff run.

Player statistics

Regular season
Scoring

Goaltending

Playoffs
Scoring

Goaltending

Awards and records
 Doug Gilmour, runner-up, Selke Trophy.
 Doug Gilmour, Molson Cup (most game star selections for Toronto Maple Leafs).

Transactions
The Maple Leafs have been involved in the following transactions during the 1993-94 season.

Trades

Waivers

Free agents

Draft picks
Toronto's draft picks at the 1993 NHL Entry Draft held at the Quebec Coliseum in Quebec City, Quebec.

Farm teams
 The Maple Leafs farm team was the St. John's Maple Leafs in St. John's, Newfoundland.

References

Notes

Bibliography
 National Hockey League Official Guide and Record Book 2006, Dan Diamond & Associates, Toronto, Ontario, .

External links
 Maple Leafs on Hockey Database
 Maple Leafs on Hockey Reference

Toronto Maple Leafs seasons
T
T